What is Philosophy? may refer to these books:
What Is Philosophy? (Deleuze and Guattari book)
What Is Philosophy? (Heidegger book)
What Is Philosophy? (Agamben book)